The Women's compound 50m event at the 2010 South American Games was held on March 21 at 9:00.

Medalists

Results

References
Report

50m Compound Women